The NOAA Observing System Architecture (NOSA) is a collection of over 100 of the environmental datasets of the National Oceanic and Atmospheric Administration (NOAA) . It was established to develop an observational architecture that helps NOAA to design observing systems that support NOAA's mission, avoid duplication of existing systems and operate efficiently in a cost-effective manner.

NOSA includes:
 NOAA's observing systems (and others) required to support NOAA's mission,
 The relationship among observing systems; including how they contribute to support NOAA's mission and associated observing requirements, and
 The guidelines governing the design of a target architecture and the evolution toward this target architecture

See also
ACARS
AERONET
FluxNet
Coastal-Marine Automated Network

Sources

External links
NOSA Homepage

Meteorological data and networks